Glassblock Dam is a proposed reservoir on the Mzingwane River, north of Gwanda, Zimbabwe with a capacity of 14 million cubic meters.

References

Dams on the Mzingwane River
Proposed infrastructure in Zimbabwe
Proposed dams